trousers or  pants are a type of baggy pants used as a common uniform of , construction workers in Japan who work on high places (such as scaffolding and skyscrapers).

The excessively widened ones are called .

References

Trousers and shorts
Japanese lower-body garments